Marwan Tarek (born 30 January 2000 in Cairo) is an Egyptian professional squash player. As of December 2019, he was ranked number 262 in the world. He won the 2019 CIB Egyptian Tour professional tournament.  He competed for the Harvard Crimson men's squash team.

References

2000 births
Living people
Egyptian male squash players
21st-century Egyptian people
Harvard Crimson men's squash players